The 1936 Northeastern Huskies football team represented Northeastern University during the 1936 college football season. It was the program's fourth season and they finished with a record of 5–4. Their head coach was Alfred McCoy serving in his fourth and final season, and their captain was Jacob Hart.

Schedule

References

Northeastern
Northeastern Huskies football seasons
Northeastern Huskies football